Dade Christian School is a private Christian school that enrolls kindergarten through 12th grade students in Miami, Florida. 

DCS was founded as a segregation academy in response to the court-ordered desegregation of Miami-Dade public schools. It is one of two private schools run by New Testament Baptist Church, a Southern Baptist church that also runs The Master's Academy. DCS had a 2018-2019 enrollment of 152.

History

Founding
New Testament Baptist Church was founded in 1954, and Dade Christian School in 1961 by Pastor Al Janney. Janney founded Dade Christian School in reaction to court decisions removing mandatory prayer from public schools and as a segregation academy, a school founded to enable white parents to avoid having their children educated alongside black children. Janney pastored New Testament Baptist Church until 1976. He also founded the Florida Association of Christian Colleges and Schools, the American Association of Christian Schools, and the Baptist University of America. The next pastor, E.G. Robertson, pastored until 1986 and oversaw Dade Christian when it was named a Blue Ribbon School in 1984.

Segregation ruling
In 1973, a lawsuit was brought against Dade Christian School by an African-American couple named in the court documents as Mr. and Mrs. Johnny Brown, Jr. At the time, Dade Christian was an all-white school. The Browns sought injunctive and monetary relief against the school for not allowing their two daughters to attend. The couple had been handed a card that said the policy of the school was "one of nonintegration" and had been asked to leave. The school claimed in their defense that it was against their religious belief to have a desegregated school because of their belief objecting to interracial marriages. The school lost, leaving Brown's attorney to comment that the last quasi-legal segregation had been eliminated. Surprisingly, the Browns still wanted their children to attend the school. When Dade Christian School appealed the ruling in Brown v. Dade Christian School, Inc. (581 F.2d 472) in 1977, the United States Court of Appeals for the Fifth Circuit ruled in favor of the plaintiff in what was considered an open question left by the Supreme Court at the time. The court failed to produce a majority opinion, though, deciding to limit themselves to the specifics of the case. They concluded that even if it was a part of the school's religious beliefs, it was a minor one and thus outweighed by anti-discrimination rules. This brought up questions regarding the free exercise of religion if courts can determine what a religion holds.

Athletics

Cheerleading

At the 2006 Fellowship of Christian Cheerleaders National Competition in Orlando, the junior high team won first place with a rendition of Grease. The elementary stunt group also finished first.

Notable alumni
Victoria Jackson, comedian, actress
Maurice Kemp (born 1991), basketball player in the Israeli Basketball Premier League

References

External links

DCS segregation ruling: article from the Harvard Law Review

1961 establishments in Florida
Baptist schools in the United States
Christian schools in Florida
Educational institutions established in 1961
High schools in Miami-Dade County, Florida
Private high schools in Florida
Private elementary schools in Florida
Private middle schools in Florida
Private schools in Miami-Dade County, Florida
Segregation academies in Florida